WIDS (570 AM) is a radio station  broadcasting a Gospel Music format. Licensed to Russell Springs, Kentucky, United States.  The station is currently owned by Hammond Broadcasting, Inc.

References

External links

Radio stations established in 1982
Gospel radio stations in the United States
Russell County, Kentucky
IDS (AM)